Sylph was a clipper ship built at Sulkea, opposite Calcutta, in 1831 for the Parsi merchant Rustomjee Cowasjee. After her purchase by the Hong Kong-based merchant house Jardine Matheson, in 1833 Sylph set a speed record by sailing from Calcutta to Macao in 17 days, 17 hours. Her primary role was to transport opium between various ports in the Far East. She disappeared en route to Singapore in 1849.

History
Sylph was designed in London by Sir Robert Seppings, surveyor of the Royal Navy, to the order of a consortium of Calcutta merchants headed by Rustomjee Cowasjee. Two contemporary paintings of Sylph show her to have been a heavily rigged ship with trysails on each mast and a tall, high-peaked spanker.

Sleek, elegant, functional and devoid of ornament, Sylph did not have the rakish lines of the later clippers, yet proved to be particularly swift. She is supposed to have run from the Sandheads to Macao in sixteen days.

Arriving at Macao in September 1832, Sylph unloaded some of the opium she had transported from Calcutta.

William Jardine and James Matheson chartered four vessels to sail north to explore the possibility of new markets for opium. Sylph, Wallace, master, left Lintin on 20 October 1832. Sylph departed with the German Protestant missionary Karl Gützlaff on board as translator. Sylph returned on 29 April 1833.

Jamesina, James Innes, master, left Lintin on 8 November and returned in early spring 1833. The next two vessels were John Biggar, William Makay, master, and Colonel Young, John Rees, master.

During the First Opium War (1839–1842) Jardine Matheson & Co. were offered a premium price for Sylph, an offer they declined on the basis of the huge profits she made from transporting opium.

Sylph and another well-known clipper, Cowasjee Family, were fitted out with extra guns and full European crews during the war, and were joined by the Lady Hayes, belonging to Jardine, Matheson & Co., the three ships sailing in company. While they were sailing among the islands Chinese war junks surrounded them and a fierce battle ensued. But Captains Wallace and Vice, of Sylph and Cowasjee Family, were two of the most experienced captains in the trade, celebrated for their daring and success in dealing with pirates, and the war junks suffered a severe defeat, many of them being sunk; after which the opium clippers had no more trouble.

While sailing from Calcutta to China and carrying 995 chests of opium, Sylph ran aground on a shoal off the Malay Peninsula on 30 January 1835. According to the Canton Register dated 14 April 1835, Captain Wallace told the vessel's insurers that she had been swamped, then beached by the northeast monsoon. The East Indiaman Clive came to the rescue and the ship and all but two chests of opium were recovered.

Fate
After undergoing re-rigging in Hong Kong in 1848 at a cost of 11,166.22 Mexican dollars, Sylph disappeared en route to Singapore the following year, possibly captured and burned by pirates based on Hainan Island.

Other sources believe that she was wrecked on the rocks of Pedra Branca off the coast of Singapore whilst carrying a cargo of opium to the value of 557,200 Spanish dollars. As Sylph disappeared while en route from Hong Kong to Calcutta, she would not have been carrying opium.

Citations

References
  Online version at Google Books
 

Phipps, John, (of the Master Attendant's Office, Calcutta), (1840) A Collection of Papers Relative to Ship Building in India ...: Also a Register Comprehending All the Ships ... Built in India to the Present Time .... (Scott),

Further reading

 Extensive coverage of Sylph's sailing career.

Opium clippers
Individual sailing vessels
Merchant ships of India
Merchant ships of the United Kingdom
Ships built in India
History of Hong Kong
Missing ships
1831 ships
Ships lost with all hands
Maritime incidents in January 1835
Maritime incidents in 1849